Hump Passage is a wide gap just southeast of Barnum Peak, through which Liv Glacier emerges from the polar plateau. It was originally referred to as the "Hump" by Rear Admiral Richard E. Byrd and is the pass over which he made his historic South Pole flight of 1929. The feature was observed by the Southern Party of the New Zealand Geological Survey Antarctic Expedition (1961–62) who recommended the perpetuation of a form of the original name.

References

Mountain passes of the Ross Dependency
Dufek Coast